Svetlakov is a surname. Notable people with the surname include: 

 Andrei Svetlakov (born 1996), Russian ice hockey player
 Sergei Svetlakov (born 1977), Russian comedian, film and television actor, TV host, producer, and screenwriter

See also
 Svetlanov